Naran (also Romanized as Narān and Narrān) is a village in Naran Rural District, in the Central District of Sanandaj County, Kurdistan Province, Iran. At the 2006 census, its population was 649, in 191 families. The village is primarily populated by Kurds.

External links 
Naran Village Photos  by Tasnim News Agency

References 

Towns and villages in Sanandaj County
Kurdish settlements in Kurdistan Province